Tone Live Schunnesson (born 17 January 1988) is a Swedish writer. 

Schunnesson studied writing at Biskops Arnös författarskola. In 2016, she debuted with her book ”Tripprapporter”. The book was well received by critics. She has also written the radio play "Härlig är min avgrund" which premiered on Sveriges Radio on 16 September 2016. Since March 2020, Schunnesson has been an culture columnist for Aftonbladet.

Bibliography
2016 – Härlig är min avgrund. Stockholm: Sveriges Radio. 
2016 – Tripprapporter. Stockholm: Norstedt. 
2020 – Dagarna, dagarna, dagarna. Stockholm: Norstedts.

References

Living people
Swedish writers
1988 births